Singapore Airlines Flight 006 (SQ006/SIA006) was a scheduled Singapore Airlines passenger flight from Singapore Changi Airport to Los Angeles International Airport via Chiang Kai-shek International Airport (now Taiwan Taoyuan International Airport) in Taipei, Taiwan. On 31 October 2000, at 23:18 Taipei local time (15:18 UTC), the Boeing 747-412 operating the flight attempted to take off from the wrong runway at Taiwan Taoyuan International Airport during a typhoon. The aircraft crashed into construction equipment on the runway, killing 81 of the 179 people aboard. Ninety-eight initially survived the impact, but two passengers died later from injuries in hospital. As of 2022, the accident is the third-deadliest on Taiwanese soil. It was the first fatal accident involving a Boeing 747-400; it is also the first and only Singapore Airlines crash to result in fatalities.

Aircraft and crew
The aircraft involved in the accident was a Boeing 747-412, registered as 9V-SPK with manufacturer's serial number 28023, powered by four Pratt & Whitney PW4056 engines. It was the 1,099th Boeing 747 built and its first flight took place on 12 January 1997. It was one of two Singapore Airlines 747-412s that were painted in the special "Tropical" paint scheme to promote Singapore Airlines' latest cabin product offerings across all of the airline's travel classes at the time. The aircraft performed its last maintenance check on 16 September 2000 and had no defects during the inspection and at the time of the accident.

The Pilot-in-Command of the aircraft was Captain Foong Chee Kong (41). He was an experienced pilot with a total of 11,235 flight hours, of which 2,017 of them were in Boeing 747-400 aircraft. The co-pilot, First Officer Latiff Cyrano (36), had 2,442 total flight hours, including 552 hours on the Boeing 747-400. The third and non-operating crew member for this sector was a relief pilot, First Officer Ng Kheng Leng (38), with approximately 5,508 total flight hours, including 4,518 hours on the Boeing 747-400.

Crash
 
At 23:00 Taipei local time (15:00 UTC) on 31 October 2000, the aircraft left Bay B5 of Chiang Kai-shek International Airport during heavy rain caused by Typhoon Xangsane. At 23:05:57, ground control cleared the aircraft to taxi to runway 05L via taxiway SS WC then NP. At 23:15:22, the aircraft was cleared for takeoff on runway 05L. Many carriers in Southeast and East Asia take off during inclement weather.

After a 6-second hold, at 23:16:36, the crew attempted takeoff on runway 05R—which had been closed for repairs—instead of the assigned runway 05L (which ran parallel to 05R). The captain correctly acknowledged that he needed to take off at 05L, but he turned  too soon and lined up with 05R. The airport was not equipped with ASDE, a ground radar that allows the air traffic controllers to monitor aircraft movements on the ground.

Because visibility was poor in the heavy rain, the flight crew did not see that construction equipment, including two excavators, two vibrating rollers, one small bulldozer, and one air compressor, had been parked on runway 05R. In addition, the runway contained concrete Jersey barriers and pits. About 41 seconds later, the aircraft collided with the machinery and broke into three major pieces. The fuselage was torn in two, and the engines and landing gear separated. A crane tore the left wing from the aircraft, forcing the jet back onto the ground. The nose struck a scoop loader, with a following large fire, destroying the forward section of the fuselage and the wings. 79 of 159 passengers and 4 of 20 crew members died in the accident. Many of the dead were seated in the middle section of the aircraft; the fuel stored in the wings exploded and incinerated that section. At 23:17:36, the emergency bell sounded and 41 firefighting vehicles, 58 ambulances, nine lighting units, and 436 personnel were dispatched to assist survivors and extinguish the fire. Chemical extinguishing agents rained on the aircraft at about three minutes after the impact. At 23:35, the fire was brought under control. At 23:40, non-airport ambulances and emergency vehicles from other agencies congregated at the north gate. At 00:00 Taipei time on 1 November, the fire was mostly extinguished and the front part of the aircraft was destroyed. Authorities established a temporary command centre.

Casualties

At the time of the crash, 179 passengers and crew, including 3 children and 3 infants, were on the aircraft. Of the 179 occupants, 83 were killed, 39 suffered from serious injuries, and 32 had minor injuries, while 25 were uninjured. Four crew members perished. Eighty-one passengers and crew died on impact immediately after the crash and two passengers died at a hospital. Most of the passengers onboard the flight were Taiwanese and Americans.

Nationalities of passengers and crew

Origin of passengers and crew and types of injuries sustained

The captain, co-pilot, and relief pilot originated from Singapore on another SQ006 flight the day before the accident, rested at a hotel in Taipei, and boarded SQ006 on 31 October. All three flight crew members survived the crash. The pilot and relief pilot sustained no injuries while the co-pilot received minor injuries. Of the seventeen cabin crew members, four died, four received serious injuries, and nine received minor injuries.

Of the passengers, 79 died, 35 received serious injuries, 22 received minor injuries, and 23 were uninjured.

The flight carried 5 first-class passengers, 28 business-class passengers (9 on lower deck and 19 on upper deck), and 126 economy-class passengers. Of the first class passengers, one received a minor injury and four received no injuries. Of the business-class passengers, fourteen (two on lower deck, twelve on upper deck) died, two (one on lower deck, one on upper deck) received serious injuries, seven (two on lower deck, five on upper deck) received minor injuries, and eight (four on lower deck, four on upper deck) were uninjured. Of the economy class passengers, 65 died, 33 received serious injuries, 14 received minor injuries, and 11 were uninjured. The lower deck passengers who died were seated in rows 22 through 38. Sixty-four of seventy-six passengers in the forward economy section were killed by the explosion of the centre fuel tank, which resulted in intense fire. In the upper deck of the business class section, 12 of 19 passengers and 1 of 2 flight attendants died from smoke inhalation and fire; 10 bodies, originating from the upper deck of business class, were found between the stairwell and the 2L exit on the main deck. All passengers in the aft economy section survived.

Of the passengers on the continuing leg to Los Angeles, 77 flew from Singapore and 82 flew from Taipei. Of the passengers originating from Singapore, 37 died. Of the passengers originating from Taipei, 42 died. Three male passengers identified as infants all died, including two Indians originating from Singapore and one Taiwanese originating from Taipei.

The Department of Forensic Pathology Institute of Foreign Medicine, Ministry of Justice performed seven autopsies. One person died from impact injuries, and six people died from severe burns. Many passengers on the flight sustained burns due to jet fuel splashing onto them.

A 45-year-old Taiwanese passenger with over 86% burns succumbed to his injuries at Linkou Chang Gung Memorial Hospital, Linkou, Taipei County (now New Taipei City) on Sunday 5 November 2000. A 30-year-old Singaporean woman who suffered 95% burns succumbed to her injuries in a Taiwanese hospital on 24 November 2000.

Among the Singaporeans who perished in the crash were the mother of a Singapore Turf Club horse trainer; an assistant professor of the National University of Singapore's Department of Computer Science and his wife; and a Republic of Singapore Air Force pilot on his way to attend the Advanced Fighter Weapons Instructor Course organized by the Air National Guard. In addition, four of the dead were Motorola employees. One of the cabin crew members who died in the crash was a former Singapore national footballer and brother of Subhas Anandan, a prominent criminal lawyer in Singapore.

Among perished passengers of other nationalities were the president and two vice-presidents of Buena Park, California-based Ameripec Inc. A professor at UC Davis survived the crash with 12% second-degree burns. William Wang, who later founded Vizio, suffered carbon monoxide poisoning but survived.

John Diaz, who at the time was an executive at MP3.com, suffered lung damage and "body shock," which resulted in compressed joints with soft tissue damage. When he appeared on The Oprah Winfrey Show, he used a walker.

Investigation findings

An investigation into the accident was conducted by the Aviation Safety Council (ASC) of the Republic of China (Taiwan). The final report was issued by the ASC on 24 April 2002. In the report section "Findings Related to Probable Causes," which detailed factors that played a major role in the circumstances leading to the accident, it was stated that the flight crew did not review the taxi route, despite having all the relevant charts, and as a result did not know the aircraft had entered the wrong runway. Upon entering the wrong runway, the flight crew had neglected to check the para visual display (PVD) and the primary flight display (PFD), which would have indicated that the aircraft was lined up on the wrong runway. According to the ASC, these errors, coupled with the imminent arrival of the typhoon and the poor weather conditions, caused the flight crew to lose situational awareness and led them to attempt to take off from the wrong runway.

Notification of details
Immediately after the accident occurred, James Boyd, a Singapore Airlines spokesperson in Los Angeles, stated that no fatalities occurred in the crash; the airline statement was later revised to state that fatalities occurred.

The airline initially stated that reports of the aircraft taking the wrong runway were untrue before the fact that the wrong runway was used was proven true.

Khan Mahmood, whose sister and parents died in SQ006, criticised the airline for taking too much time to notify relatives.

A counselling centre opened at Los Angeles International Airport to deal with relatives of passengers.

Relatives of victims provided blood samples to identify bodies.

Contesting investigation findings

The report by ASC was deemed controversial by Singapore's Ministry of Transport, Singapore Airlines and the International Federation of Air Line Pilots' Associations (IFALPA), among others.

Singaporean officials protested that the report did not present a full account of the incident and was incomplete, as responsibility for the accident appeared to have been placed mainly on the flight crew of SQ006, while other equally valid contributing factors had been played down. The team from Singapore that participated in the investigation felt that the lighting and signage at the airport did not measure up to international standards. Some critical lights were missing or not working. No barriers or markings were put up at the start of the closed runway, which would have alerted the flight crew that they were on the wrong runway. The Singapore team felt that these two factors were given less weight than was proper, as another flight crew had almost made the same mistake of using runway 05R to take off days before the accident.

Singapore Airlines also issued a statement after the release of the ASC report. In their statement, Singapore Airlines reiterated the points brought up by the Singapore investigators and added that air traffic control (ATC) did not follow their own procedure when they gave clearance for SQ006 to take off despite ATC's not being able to see the aircraft. Singapore Airlines also clarified that the para visual display (PVD) was meant to help the flight crew maintain the runway centerline in poor visibility, rather than to identify the runway in use.

The statement by Kay Yong, managing director of the Republic of China's Aviation Safety Council, implied that pilot error played a major role in the crash of the Boeing 747-400, which led to the deaths of 83 people. He stated that the airport should have placed markers stating that the runway was closed to takeoffs and landings.

Runway 05R was not blocked off by barriers because part of the strip was used by landing planes to taxi back to the airport terminal. The pilot confirmed twice with the control tower that he was on the correct runway; controllers did not know the plane had actually gone on to the wrong runway because the airport lacked ground radar and the plane was out of sight of the tower at the time of its takeoff attempt.

Actions of flight crew and flight attendants
A survivor of the crash, John Wiggans, stated in a USA Today article that the staff were unable to help the passengers escape from the aircraft because they were frozen by fear or lack of competence in emergency procedures; Wiggans was seated in the upper deck business class area. The Straits Times carried reports of flight attendants saving lives of passengers. One story from the newspaper stated that a flight attendant initially escaped the crash, but she ran back into the aircraft to attempt to save passengers, and died.

The Australian reported that some flight attendants helped passengers, while some flight attendants fled the aircraft before all passengers were accounted for. The New Paper stated that the pilots attempted to help the passengers.

The Taiwanese report stated that the relief pilot (Crew Member 3, or CM-3) said in an interview that he was the first to leave the cockpit and the last to leave the aircraft.(pp. 108/508) A passenger sitting in seat 17A stated that the right upper deck door flight attendant directed him to the main deck via the stairs; the flight attendant later died.(pp. 108/508)

Upper deck passengers and flight attendants stated that the Crew-In-Charge flight attendant (CIC) went upstairs after the first impact; the Crew-In-Charge flight attendant later died.(pp. 109/508)

The 3R and 3L flight attendants also died; they were seated in the middle of the aircraft.(pp. 110/508)

Aftermath

The accident aircraft 9V-SPK was painted in special livery by Singapore Airlines, a scheme called "Tropical", at the time of the accident. The livery was unveiled in September 1998 in conjunction with the launch of Singapore Airlines' latest cabin product offerings across all of the airline's travel classes at the time. After the accident, 9V-SPL, the sister aircraft painted with the same livery, was removed from service and repainted with standard Singapore Airlines livery. It would be 15 years before the airline would introduce another special livery, this time on 2 of its A380 aircraft in conjunction with Singapore's 50th National Day celebrations.

About two weeks after the accident, Singapore Airlines changed the Singapore–Taipei–Los Angeles route flight number from SQ006 to SQ30. The return flight to Singapore, SQ005, was also changed to SQ29. The flight number was again changed to SQ28/27 a few years later. The operating aircraft was replaced by the Boeing 777-200ER and then 777-300ER. Singapore Airlines terminated the Singapore–Taipei–Los Angeles route on 1 October 2008. After a 13-year hiatus, the airline resumed the Singapore–Taipei–Los Angeles and vice versa service using the flight number SQ36/35 onboard the Airbus A350-900 aircraft.

After the release of the ASC report, Republic of China (ROC) public prosecutors called upon the flight crew of SQ006 to return to the ROC for questioning and the three-member crew complied. Rumours abounded at the time that the pilots might be detained in the ROC and charged with negligence. IFALPA had previously stated that it would advise its members of the difficulties of operating into the ROC if the flight crew of SQ006 were prosecuted. The prosecutors did not press charges and the flight crew were allowed to leave the ROC.

Despite a Taiwanese High Prosecutor's decision to not prosecute the pilots for the first three years after the crash, Singapore Airlines subsequently fired the captain and first officer involved in the SQ006 crash in 2000.

Singapore Airlines offered immediate financial relief of US$5,000 to each survivor a few days after the incident. Singapore Airlines also offered US$400,000 to the families of each of the dead. However, more than 30 survivors and families of the dead rejected the offer and sued Singapore Airlines for higher damages. Forty lawsuits were filed against Singapore Airlines in Singapore while more than 60 passenger lawsuits were filed in the United States.  All the lawsuits were settled out of court.

The Association of Asian American Yale Alumni named a Community Service Fellowship program after Tina Eugenia Yeh, an alumnus who perished in the accident.

Repatriation of bodies
By 8 November 2000, several bodies were scheduled to be repatriated. Of the bodies:
19, including 14 Americans, 3 Taiwanese, and 2 Indians, were repatriated to the United States
13, including 11 Singaporeans, 1 British, and 1 American, were repatriated to Singapore
10, including 8 Indians and 2 Americans, were repatriated to India
4 were repatriated to Malaysia
3 Americans were repatriated to Canada
1 was repatriated to Indonesia
1 was repatriated to Japan
1 was repatriated to the Netherlands
1 was repatriated to the United Kingdom
1 was repatriated to Vietnam
The bodies of 14 Taiwanese passengers and the others remained in Taipei to be collected by relatives.

Hospitalization and release of survivors
By 2 November 2000, 40 passengers and crew were hospitalised, of whom 11 were later released that night. On 5 November 2000, 34 passengers and crew remained hospitalised. 64 were discharged from the hospitals. A Taiwanese passenger died the same day. On 8 November 2000, 24 passengers and crew remained hospitalised: 20 in the Republic of China (Taiwan), 3 in Singapore and 1 in the United States. The Republic of Singapore Air Force deployed a specially configured KC-135R for the medical evacuation of critical Singaporean victims. 73 survivors, 40 who were not hospitalised and 33 who were discharged, had either returned home or continued with their travel.

In popular culture
The accident and its subsequent investigation process was dramatized into a documentary titled as "Caution to the Wind" as the third episode of the twelfth season of the Canadian TV series Mayday (also known as Air Crash Investigation). A movie titled as Thread That Binds includes an interview with a surviving flight attendant.

See also

Aviation safety
Typhoon Xangsane (2000)
Aeroflot Flight 3352
China Airlines Flight 204, another wrong runway takeoff.
Comair Flight 5191, which crashed near Lexington, Kentucky, after using the wrong runway for takeoff.
Linate Airport disaster, a runway collision, where an MD-87 collided with a Cessna Citation CJ2. 
Western Airlines Flight 2605, a very similar accident where the left and right runways were confused, coincidentally on the same date, although this flight was landing—not taking off.
Korean Air Lines Flight 084, a flight that attempted to take off from the wrong runway at Anchorage International Airport, leading to a runway collision with another aircraft.
LATAM Perú Flight 2213, a flight that struck a fire engine during takeoff.

Notes

References

External links

 Investigation reports

Aviation Safety Council 
Investigation including the Report on Singapore Airlines Flight 006 (Archive) – The English version is the original version and the version of reference
 Investigation including the Report on Singapore Airlines Flight 006 (Archive) 
 Interim safety announcement

Singapore Airlines press statements
Flight SQ006 Information 

 Court documents
Eva Van Schijndel's motion (Archive) – Accesslaw.com
United States Court Document regarding settlement of SQ006 victims (Archive)

 Cockpit voice recorder data
Cockpit voice recorder and air traffic control transcript for Singapore Airlines Flight 006 – Aviation Safety Council

 Analyst of the ASC Final Report

Airliner accidents and incidents caused by weather
Airliner accidents and incidents caused by pilot error
Aviation accidents and incidents caused by air traffic controller error
Aviation accidents and incidents in Taiwan
006
Aviation accidents and incidents in 2000
Accidents and incidents involving the Boeing 747
2000 meteorology
Airliner accidents and incidents involving ground collisions
October 2000 events in Asia
Singapore–Taiwan relations
2000 disasters in Taiwan